Ihor Tarasovych Dashko (June 18, 1977, Sambir, Lviv Region — April 9, 2022, Mariupol, Donetsk region) — Ukrainian military officer, lieutenant colonel border guard of the State Border Service of Ukraine, participant of the Russian-Ukrainian war. He was awarded the Hero of Ukraine posthumously on April 17, 2022.

Biography 
Ihor Dashko was born on June 18, 1977, in Sambor, Lviv region.

Studied at Secondary School No. 1 named after T. Shevchenko, Sambir, which he graduated in 1994.

After graduating from the Academy of the State Border Service of Ukraine in 1999, he started working in the city of Mariupol, in the Department of the State Border Service of Ukraine.

From the summer of 2012 to January 2022, he served in the Western Regional Department of the State Security Service.

A month before the Russian invasion of Ukraine, he again moved to the city of Mariupol.

Circumstances of death 
On April 9, 2022, he blew himself up at a radio station in Mariupol so that it would not reach by the Russian invaders. The last his words on the radio were "Glory to Ukraine! ".

Awards 

 The title of «Hero of Ukraine» with the award of the «Golden Star» order (April 17, 2022, posthumously) — for personal courage and heroism, shown in the defense of state sovereignty and territorial integrity of Ukraine, selfless service to the Ukrainian people.

Notes

Sources 

 Kovalenko, S. The heroic feat of border guard Dashka will be written in golden letters in the history of the Ukrainian people and the defense of Mariupol   // ArmyInform. — 2022. — April 20.

Links 

  // Державна прикордонна служба України. — 2022. — 18 квітня.
 https://www.youtube.com/watch?v=BY3dflo9dpE
 https://dpsu.gov.ua/ua/news/%20VIDEO%20-Geroichniy-podvig-prikordonnika-bude-vpisaniy-zolotimi-literami-v-istoriyu-ukrainskogo-narodu-ta-oboroni-Mariupolya/
 https://www.youtube.com/watch?v=UGgwS5A-57I
 https://www.youtube.com/watch?v=SUtz0VY-XRw

1977 births
2022 deaths
Ukrainian military personnel
People from Lviv Oblast
Ukrainian military personnel killed in the 2022 Russian invasion of Ukraine